Cinco Minutos may refer to:

 Five Minutes (novel) or Cinco Minutos, a novel by José de Alencar
 "Cinco Minutos" (song), a song by Gloria Trevi

See also
 Five Minutes (disambiguation)